Savannah Clarke (born 9 July 2003) is an Australian singer, dancer, actress, model and composer. She first gained recognition for her role in the musical The Sound of Music. She is best known for representing Australia in the global pop group Now United.

Biography 
Savannah was born on 9 July 2003 in Sydney, Australia. Being encouraged by her mother from an early age, she always had an interest in pursuing music and dance. While in kindergarten, Savannah learned to play the piano; soon, she started to act in commercials; and also became a model. The first musical that Savannah participated in was The Sound of Music, which she said it was like a dream. Savannah was a model in South Korea for 3 months. Clarke currently attends Village Nation College in Sydney.

Career

2019–present: HOME, Now United 
On 25 February 2019, Savannah released her first soloist material entitled "Home". In 2019, Simon Fuller started looking for a 15th member for Now United, making polls to know which country should be, with the result being Australia. Savannah discovered the group from Instagram, and soon began to dig deeper into it. Soon, she was recruited into the group by Simon. On 11 February 2020, Savannah met the group members in person.

Savannah was officially introduced as the Australian representative to the group on 28 February 2020. Savannah's first music video with the group was 'Come Together', which was released in March 2020. The group's first single with Savannah Clarke was "By My Side".

Discography

With Now United

Filmography

Documentaries

Awards and nominations

With Now United

References

External links 
 

2003 births
Living people
Models from Sydney
Australian women singers
Australian female dancers
XIX Entertainment artists
Now United members
Actresses from Sydney
Musicians from Sydney